Sol et Gobelet was a French language children's television show made in Quebec, which was broadcast from 1968 to 1971 on Radio-Canada. Its stories revolved around the adventures of clowns Sol (played by Marc Favreau) and Gobelet (played by Luc Durand).

External links
 emissions.ca: Sol et Gobelet  

Television shows filmed in Quebec
1960s Canadian children's television series
Ici Radio-Canada Télé original programming
1968 Canadian television series debuts
1971 Canadian television series endings
1970s Canadian children's television series
Television shows about clowns